was a town located in Shimotsuga District, Tochigi Prefecture, Japan.

As of 2003, the town had an estimated population of 20,283 and a density of 904.28 persons per km². The total area was 22.43 km².

On January 10, 2006, Ishibashi, along with the town of Minamikawachi (from Kawachi District), and the town of Kokubunji (also from Shimotsuga District), was merged to create the new city of Shimotsuke.

External links
 Shimotsuke official website 

Dissolved municipalities of Tochigi Prefecture
Shimotsuke, Tochigi